Takashi Murakami (born 25 May 1944) is a Japanese professional golfer.

Early life 
Murakami was born in Shizuoka. He started playing golf at the age of 11.

Professional career 
He won 11 tournaments on the Japan Golf Tour and led the money list in 1975.

Murakami also had a decent amount of success outside of Japan. He recorded a number of runner-up finishes in the Australasian region. They were the 1968 West Australian Championship, 1969 Australian PGA Championship, and 1972 New Zealand PGA Championship. He also had much success on the Asia Golf Circuit events in 1972. He won the Malaysian Open and finished runner-up at the Singapore Open and Hong Kong Open. In the United States he finished in a tie for second at the PGA Tour's 1977 Hawaiian Open. He also played in the Masters Tournament in 1976 and 1977.

Professional wins (18)

Japan Golf Tour wins (11)
1973 (1) All Nippon Doubles (with Hideyo Sugimoto)
1974 (2) Chunichi Crowns, Golf Digest Tournament
1975 (4) Japan PGA Match-Play Championship, Japan Open, Japan PGA Championship, Nippon Series
1976 (3) ANA Sapporo Open, Kanto Pro Championship, Bridgestone Tournament
1977 (1) Golf Digest Tournament

Asia Golf Circuit win (1) 
1972 Malaysian Open

Japanese circuit wins (6)
1967 Grand Monarch
1968 Rolex Tournament
1969 All Nippon Doubles (with Hideyo Sugimoto)
1970 All Nippon Doubles (with Hideyo Sugimoto)
1972 All Nippon Doubles (with Masashi Ozaki), Tohoku Classic

Team appearances
World Cup (representing Japan): 1972, 1975, 1976

See also
List of golfers with most Japan Golf Tour wins

References

External links

Japanese male golfers
Japan Golf Tour golfers
Sportspeople from Shizuoka Prefecture
1944 births
Living people